A clairvoyant is someone who allegedly has the power of clairvoyance. Other meanings include:


Film and television
The Clairvoyant (1924 film), a lost film which featured Sarah Bernhardt in her last performance
The Clairvoyant (1935 film), starring Claude Rains and Fay Wray
The Clairvoyant (1982 film), a thriller film starring Perry King
The Clairvoyant (TV series), British sitcom
John Garrett (comics), the main antagonist of the television series Agents of S.H.I.E.L.D., where he is known as "The Clairvoyant"

Music
Clairvoyant, 1986 debut album by guitarist Leni Stern
"The Clairvoyant" (song), by Iron Maiden, 1988
"Clairvoyant", 2008 song by Two Steps From Hell from Classics Volume One
"Clairvoyant", 2013 song by The Story So Far from The Story So Far / Stick to Your Guns
Clairvoyant (EP), 2014 EP by Jenn Grant
Clairvoyant (album), 2017 album by The Contortionist
"Clairvoyant", 2017 song by The Contortionist from Clairvoyant

Other uses
Clairvoyant (horse), French Thoroughbred racehorse and sire